Facundo Martín Pérez (born 31 July 1999) is an Argentine professional footballer who plays as a midfielder for Lanús.

Professional career
Pérez signed his first professional contract with Lanús in June 2019. He made his professional debut for Lanús in a 2-0 Argentine Primera División win over Godoy Cruz on 2 February 2020.

References

External links
 

1999 births
Living people
People from Quilmes
Argentine footballers
Association football midfielders
Club Atlético Lanús footballers
Argentine Primera División players
Sportspeople from Buenos Aires Province